Poitevin  may refer to:

 From or related to Poitou 
 From or related to the town of Poitiers
 Poitevin dialect, the language spoken in the Poitou
 Poitevin horse, a breed of draught horse from Poitou, France
 Poitevine goat, a breed of goat from Western France
 Poitevin hound, a breed of hound

People
Alphonse Louis Poitevin (1819-1882), French chemist, photographer and civil engineer
Guy Poitevin (1927-2008), French footballer and manager
Maixent Poitevin, mayor of Poitiers from 1564 to 1566
Roger the Poitevin (1060s-1130s), Anglo-Norman aristocrat

Language and nationality disambiguation pages